Autographa corusca is a moth of the family Noctuidae. It is endemic to the wet coastal forests of the Pacific Northwest, extending from northern California, through Washington and British Columbia to southern Alaska.

The wingspan is about 33 mm. Adults are on wing in midsummer.

The larvae feed on Alnus species.

References

External links
Bug Guide
 Images
Macromoths of Northwest Forests and Woodlands

Plusiini
Moths of North America
Moths described in 1885